Cochapeti District is one of five districts of the province Huarmey in Peru.

References

Districts of the Huarmey Province
Districts of the Ancash Region